is a railway station on the Iida Line in Tenryū-ku, Hamamatsu, Shizuoka Prefecture, Japan, operated by Central Japan Railway Company (JR Central).

Lines
Izumma Station is served by the Iida Line and is 55.4 kilometers from the starting point of the line at Toyohashi Station.

Station layout
The station has one ground-level side platform serving a single bi-directional track, built on a gentle curve. There is no station building, but only a weather shelter on the platform. The station is unattended.

Adjacent stations

History
Izumma Station was established on November 11, 1934 as a passenger station on the now defunct Sanshin Railway. On August 1, 1943, the Sanshin Railway was nationalized along with several other local lines to form the Iida line. Along with its division and privatization of JNR on April 1, 1987, the station came under the control and operation of the Central Japan Railway Company.

Passenger statistics
In fiscal 2017, the station was used by an average of 2 passengers daily (boarding passengers only).

Surrounding area
The station is located in an isolated rural area.

See also
 List of railway stations in Japan

References

External links

  Iida Line station information
	

Stations of Central Japan Railway Company
Iida Line
Railway stations in Japan opened in 1934
Railway stations in Shizuoka Prefecture
Railway stations in Hamamatsu